Charles Porter may refer to:
Charles Porter (Australian politician) (1910–2004), member for Toowong in the Queensland Legislative Assembly, Australia
Charles Porter (Lord Chancellor of Ireland) (1631–1696)
Charles Porter (Pennsylvania politician) (1756–1830), speaker of the Pennsylvania House of Representatives, 1806
Charles H. Porter (mayor), owner of the Boston Red Stockings, 1873–1874, mayor of Quincy, Massachusetts
Charles Ethan Porter (1848–1923), American still life painter
Charles H. Porter (Virginia politician) (1833–1897), U.S. Representative from Virginia
Charles O. Porter (1919–2006), Oregon politician
Charles W. Porter (1849–1891), Secretary of State of Vermont
Charles Talbot Porter (1826–1910), American lawyer, engineer, and inventor of mechanical devices
Chilla Porter (Charles Michael Porter, 1936–2020), 1956 Australian Olympic silver medalist in high jump
Christian Porter (Charles Christian Porter, born 1970), member of the Australian Parliament for Pearce
Charles Porter IV, photographer who won the Pulitzer Prize for Breaking News Photography

See also 
Chuck Porter (disambiguation)